Marathon des Sables, or MdS, (French for Marathon of the Sands, also known as Sahara Marathon) is a six-day,  ultramarathon, which is approximately the distance of six regular marathons.

This multiday race is held every year in southern Morocco, in the Sahara Desert. It has been regarded as the toughest foot race on Earth. The first event of the Marathon started in 1986.

History
The marathon was the brainchild of French concert promoter Patrick Bauer who in 1984 traversed the Sahara desert on foot and alone. He covered 350 km (214 mi) in 12 days without encountering a single oasis or desert community along the way. Two years later in 1986 the first Marathon des Sables was run. Twenty-three runners participated in the race with Bernard Gaudin and Christiane Plumere, both of France, finishing as the winning man and woman.

By 2009 over 1,000 runners participated in the event and the Solidarité Marathon des Sables association was created. The aim is to develop projects to assist children and disadvantaged populations in the domains of health, education and sustainable development in Morocco.

In 2017, two new Marathon des Sables events took place for the first time: the Half Marathon des Sables on Fuerteventura in the Canary Islands in September, and another full-length Marathon des Sables event in Peru in November.

Due to the COVID-19 pandemic the 2020 Marathon des Sables (35th) was postponed from 3–13 April to 18–28 September, following a warning officially issued by the Ministry of the Interior of the Kingdom of Morocco as stated in the marathon's official website. It was eventually cancelled.

Winners

Notable participants
Moroccan brothers Lahcen and Mohamad Ahansal, who won 10 and 6 editions respectively, Mohamad also being 7 times second behind his brother.
 Mauro Prosperi, former Olympian from Sicily, entered the race in 1994 but was set 299 km off route by a harsh sand storm. He was lost for 10 days before being found in Algeria, following a well-publicized search of the desert.
In 1994 René Nevola, Mike Stroud, Mike Lean and Richard Cooper became the first British runners to complete the Marathon des Sables. René Nevola was the first Briton to complete the race and finished in 22nd place.
Marco Olmo, Italian ultratrail specialist, ran all editions since 1996, with best placement 3rd (achieved three times). At the 2013 edition, Olmo was 64 years old, and he was 47 when he ran his first.
Chris Moon from Lanarkshire became the first amputee to complete the Marathon des Sables in 1996. Moon had lost his right arm and leg while supervising the clearing of landmines in Mozambique.
Dima and Lama Hattab, Jordanian twins who were the first female Middle Eastern participants in the race in 2001.
Jack Osbourne entered in 2006 but quit early on in the second stage. He was running as part of his Jack Osbourne: Adrenaline Junkie TV series.
Luis Enrique Martínez García (known as Luis Enrique), Spanish former professional footballer, and former manager of FC Barcelona, completed the marathon in 2008.
James Cracknell, British rower and adventurer, competed in the 2010 race and became the highest placing Briton to ever compete in the race, finishing 12th until fellow Briton Danny Kendall placed 5th in 2014. In 2017 Tom Evans became the first Briton to finish in the first three, finishing third overall.
 Explorer Sir Ranulph Fiennes became the oldest Briton to complete the Marathon des Sables in 2015, at age 71. In doing so he raised over £1million for the Marie Curie charity. However in 2017 David Exell became the oldest brit to complete the race at 75 
Preet Chandi, completed the Marathon des Sables in 2019. A British-born Sikh army officer, she became the first woman of colour to complete a solo expedition to reach the South Pole on 3 January 2022.
 Cactus became the first dog to compete the Marathon des Sables in 2019. Cactus, a stray dog, started joining in with the runners during the second stage of the race and then went on to complete the remaining stages of the race. Cactus was awarded the official race number 000 and received his finishers medal.

Bibliography 

Ted Archer: Carved by god, cursed by the devil – a true story of running the Sahara Desert. Redwood City CA, University of Dreams Foundation 2009. 
Patrick Bauer ... [et al.]: Le Marathon des Sables. Paris, SPE (Société de production éditoriale) 2000.  (English version by David Waldron).
 John Bonallak: The desert run. Wellington, New Zealand, Learning Media Ltd. 1999. .
 Steve Cushing: 24th Marathon des Sables  – a competitor's tale. Leicester UK, Matador  2010, .
 Guy Giaoui; Foued Berahou: Ultramarathon stage racing - from our experiences of the Marathon des Sables, the Trans Aq', and other races - a practical guide. St-Genest-Malifaux, Raidlight 2008. .
 Mark Hines: The Marathon des Sables - seven days in the Sahara - enduring the toughest footrace on earth. London, Health Body Publishing 2007.  (hbk.).  (pbk. 2010).
Marcel Nickler: Running the Sahara - a diary from the desert and beyond, BoD, 
Monika Nicolle: Histoire d'un Marathon des Sables – 245 kilomètres dans le désert... Paris, Éditions de l'Onde 2010. .
 Eddy Poirier: Vaincre soi-même : Marathon des Sables! Toute une histoire. [S.l.], Glob 2009. .
 Pierre-Emmanuel Rastoin: Regard sur le Marathon des Sables : 2004/06. Biarritz, SAI 2007. .
 Herbert Meneweger: Marathon des Sables - die Grenze ist, wo die Vorstellungskraft endet - der härteste Marathonlauf der Welt, 243 Kilometer durch die Sahara. Anthering AUT, Meneweger 2003. .
 Mike Stroud OBE. (re-issued 2004). Survival Of The Fittest: Understanding Health and Peak Physical Performance. 
 Dr Dan Tunstall Pedoe: Marathon Medicine. 2001, page 186. .

Notes

External links
 Official website of the Marathon des Sables
 Pictures of the Marathon des Sables from Rob Plijnaar, competitor in 2008
 Documentary on the 14th Marathon des Sables by Les Guthman

Multiday races
Ultra-Trail World Tour
Recurring sporting events established in 1986
Athletics in Morocco
Trail running competitions
1986 establishments in Morocco